Elizabeth Berrington (born 3 August 1970) is an English actress and graduate of the Webber Douglas Academy of Dramatic Art; she is best known for her roles as Ruby Fry in Waterloo Road, Paula Kosh in Stella, Mel Debrou in Moving Wallpaper, and Dawn Stevenson in The Syndicate. She has also featured in British television series such as The Bill, Doctor Who, The Office, Casualty, The Lakes, The Grimleys, and Rose and Maloney.

Career
From 1996 to 1999 Berrington appeared alongside Emma Wray and Tony Robinson in the ITV comedy-drama My Wonderful Life. In 1999 she played Marie Antoinette in Let Them Eat Cake, starring Dawn French and Jennifer Saunders.

In cinema Berrington has featured in many films, such as The Little Vampire and, more recently, Nanny McPhee with Emma Thompson and In Bruges alongside Colin Farrell, Brendan Gleeson and Ralph Fiennes. In 2008 and 2009 she played Mel in Moving Wallpaper, and was in the 2008 Poirot episode "Cat Among the Pigeons". Berrington also featured in the 1993 Mike Leigh film Naked, and had a role in Leigh's 1996 drama film Secrets & Lies, starring Brenda Blethyn, Marianne Jean-Baptiste and Timothy Spall.

In 2009 Berrington and actress Shirley Henderson were the stars of the popular ITV drama May Contain Nuts in which she played Ffion, a snobbish suburban mother. Berrington also played Nicola, a nurse, in the BBC Two comedy Psychoville. She appeared as Food Technology teacher Ruby Fry in the BBC TV series Waterloo Road from 2009 to 2011, departing after two series. She played "Auntie" in "The Doctor's Wife", an episode in series 6 of Doctor Who. In 1997 she appeared in a TV Licence advert. In 2012 she was in an episode of New Tricks, playing a murderer called Grace. From 2012 to 2013 she portrayed Paula Kosh in the Sky 1 comedy series Stella; in 2015 she returned for two episodes.

In 2011 Berrington appeared in the BBC Christmas show Lapland as Paula, a role which she reprised in the six-part spin-off series Being Eileen, which aired from February 2013.

Berrington appeared on stage in the 2013 play The Low Road. Later, in August 2014, she appeared in Series 2, Episode 4 of Cuckoo as Sandra.

In 2016 Berrington appeared in "Hated in the Nation", the sixth episode of the third season of the Netflix original, Black Mirror.

Filmography

Film

Television

References

External links
 
 
 

1970 births
Living people
English television actresses
English film actresses
People from Wallasey
21st-century English actresses
20th-century English actresses